The 2013 Costa Rican Cup (known as the Torneo de Copa Banco Nacional or Copa BN for sponsorship reasons) is the 1st staging of the Costa Rican Cup. The competition began on July 7 and finished on August 4 with Saprissa crowned as the first champions after defeating Carmelita in the penalty shoot-outs in the final at the national stadium.

The 2013 Copa BN featured 16 teams, 12 from the Primera División (including the newly promoted team, Universidad de Costa Rica) and 4 from the Segunda División (not including the recently relegated team, A.D. San Carlos).

Qualified teams
The following teams competed in the 2013 Costa Rican Cup

11 teams of 2012–13 Costa Rican Primera División season:

Alajuelense
Belén
Carmelita
Cartaginés
Herediano
Limón
Pérez Zeledón
Puntarenas
Santos de Guápiles
Saprissa
Uruguay de Coronado

5 teams of 2012-13 Costa Rican Segunda División season:

AS Puma Generaleña
Guanacasteca
Jacó Rays
Juventud Escazuceña
Universidad de Costa Rica

Bracket
The seeding was made on 20 June 2013.

Top goalscorers

References

External links
 

Costa Rican Cup
Cup